These are the matches that Torino has played in European football competitions. In UEFA European football, Torino was a finalist in the UEFA Cup in 1991–92.

Results 
Torino's score listed first.

European Cup

European Cup Winners' Cup

UEFA Cup and Europa League

UEFA Intertoto Cup

FIFA-only recognized seasonal competitions

Inter-Cities Fairs Cup

Overall record

By competition 
As of 29 August 2019

Source: UEFA.comPld = Matches played; W = Matches won; D = Matches drawn; L = Matches lost; GF = Goals for; GA = Goals against; GD = Goal Difference.

By country 

As of 29 August 2019
Key

Source:

Notes

References

 
T